Choi Min (born Choi Min-Sung on January 1, 1987) is a South Korean actor. He is best known for his roles in My Bittersweet Life, My Dear Cat, and Cinderella with Four Knights. Recently, he made his comeback as Lee Yeon-seok in Again My Life after a six-year hiatus.

Filmography

Films

Television series

Music videos

References 

1987 births
Living people
South Korean male film actors
South Korean male television actors
Place of birth missing (living people)